Ramón Meña (born 14 December 1967) is a Panamanian wrestler. He competed at the 1988 Summer Olympics and the 1992 Summer Olympics.

References

External links
 

1967 births
Living people
Panamanian male sport wrestlers
Olympic wrestlers of Panama
Wrestlers at the 1988 Summer Olympics
Wrestlers at the 1992 Summer Olympics
Pan American Games silver medalists for Panama
Wrestlers at the 1987 Pan American Games
Wrestlers at the 1991 Pan American Games
Wrestlers at the 1995 Pan American Games
Pan American Games medalists in wrestling
Place of birth missing (living people)
20th-century Panamanian people
21st-century Panamanian people